The short-tassel weedfish (Cologrammus flavescens) is a species of clinid native to the Pacific Ocean waters around New Zealand and Australia.  This species are known to feed on fishes and benthic crustaceans. It is the only species in its genus. Klunzinger's name, Clinus marmoratus, is a homonym and was preoccupied by Castelnau's Clinus marmoratus, rendering it invalid for this fish and this name is now considered to be a junior synonym of Cologrammus flavescens.

References

Clinidae
Taxa named by Frederick Hutton (scientist)
Fish described in 1872